James William Bailey (January 10, 1938 – May 30, 2015) was an American singer, film, television and stage actor, and female impersonator.

Early years

Bailey was born on January 10, 1938, in Philadelphia to Sara and Claude Bailey. He had one brother, Claude. As a teenager he studied opera at the Philadelphia Conservatory of Music, and was on the television program The Children's Hour for almost a year, where he performed by acting, singing and dancing. His family moved to Palmyra, New Jersey when he was ten years old, and then Riverside Township, where he attended Riverside High School.

Career

Bailey appeared in over 70 television and movie roles, including appearances on Ally McBeal, Here's Lucy, Night Court, The Rockford Files, Switch, Vega$, The Tonight Show Starring Johnny Carson, The Ed Sullivan Show, The Carol Burnett Show, The Merv Griffin Show, Late Night with David Letterman, The Mike Douglas Show, The Dean Martin Show and The Joan Rivers Show.

Bailey's fame began in the late 1960s when he created the "illusions" of singers Judy Garland, Barbra Streisand, and Peggy Lee by vocally imitating them in his own operatically trained voice. Bailey appeared on concert stages throughout the world, including headlining in Las Vegas at hotels such as The Thunderbird, Caesars Palace, The Desert Inn, The Sands, Harrah's, The Dunes and performing at New York City's Carnegie Hall a total of nine times and The Palladium Theater in London a total of 17 times. Bailey also performed for the British Royal Family twice and for four United States presidents.

From 1966 through to 1968, Bailey played summer stock in such shows as The Boy Friend, Calamity Jane with Ginger Rogers, Bells are Ringing and Wildcat with Gale Storm.

During this time, Bailey was introduced to and became friends with Phyllis Diller. Bailey learned to re-create the comedian/actress's personality and later added her to his repertoire. In 1968, Bailey moved to Los Angeles and put together a nightclub act with Michael Greer, performing at the Redwood Room, this time adding Judy Garland to his repertoire. When Garland came to see Bailey's show, she jumped up onto the stage and asked him to sing a song with her. Bailey agreed and the two sang a duet of "Bye Bye Blackbird", which Bailey had intended on singing as himself.

The two later became friends, and Garland became Bailey's mentor. The two remained friends until Garland's death in 1969. In 1970, Bailey was booked in Las Vegas and became an overnight sensation. He appeared on The Ed Sullivan Show, which helped launch an international career. His performance as Judy Garland singing "The Man that Got Away" was such a phenomenon he was asked back a couple of months later to perform as Peggy Lee. He also performed as himself on both shows.

Bailey's success continued as he appeared for performances at New York's Carnegie Hall, the London Palladium, and the Dorothy Chandler Pavilion in Los Angeles.  While in London he performed on the legendary David Frost's show. He then guest starred on the popular television variety show The Carol Burnett Show, where the two sang a comedic duet of "Happy Days Are Here Again" with Bailey appearing as Barbra Streisand, and made several appearances on The Tonight Show Starring Johnny Carson.

Bailey was approached by Lucille Ball in 1972 after she saw him at the Dorothy Chandler Pavilion and asked him to guest star on her popular television show Here's Lucy. Ball was so impressed by Bailey and his performance, she titled the show Lucy and Jim Bailey, and she also threw a party for him after the show's taping. The two remained close friends until Ball's death in 1989. Bailey also became very close friends with Ball's daughter Lucie Arnaz. The two remained close friends, doing benefit performances in honor of her late mother and father at the Lucy Desi festival in Jamestown, New York. In 1973, Bailey was asked to return to Carnegie Hall for two nights to perform again. This time, he was approached by United Artists to record and release his performance. The album became a success and was sold worldwide.

 Also in 1973, Bailey teamed with Liza Minnelli, daughter of his mentor Judy Garland, in Las Vegas at The Flamingo. The two put together a concert recreating the performances by Minnelli and her late mother in London, with Bailey standing in as Garland. The "Judy and Liza Concert" met with great success, they opened the show with Jim as Judy singing "Well, Hello Liza" just as they had done at the Palladium years earlier. Later, Minnelli made a gift to Bailey of one of her late mother's treasured pearl rings.

The mid-1970s saw Bailey as a mainstay in showrooms in Las Vegas, it was at this time he was named Las Vegas Entertainer of the Year. He also was booked for concerts around the world, including the O'Keefe Centre in Toronto, and venues in Australia and South America.

Bailey performed at some major venues. He performed at Super Bowl XII as Barbra Streisand and himself, did a show for Queen Elizabeth II of the United Kingdom and her husband Prince Philip, Duke of Edinburgh as Barbra Streisand and himself. He performed at the 1984 Winter Olympics opening ceremony and at the People's Choice Awards. He also returned to Carnegie Hall and the London Palladium doing multiple nights at each venue.  
In the late 1980s, he began to appear again in feature films. Because Barbra Streisand was not performing on the night club and concert circuit in the mid 1980s, Bailey decided to re-create some of her great movie performances and adapt them to his stage performances. In the late 1980s, he also toured with the musical Nite Club Confidential. Ten years later, in 1995, he performed at an event for Streisand, Clint Eastwood, Warren Beatty, and others. 
 
In the 1990s, Bailey performed for Diana, Princess of Wales and Prince Charles in London. He again performed at Carnegie Hall and the London Palladium, as well as another long stint at The Sands in Las Vegas and Harrah's in all of their main showrooms. After touring extensively in the 1990s, Bailey opened the Jim Bailey Theater in Palm Springs, California, but closed the theater just 10 months later when offers were coming in for more theatrical work.

At the start of the new millennium, Bailey did a guest starring role on Ally McBeal as Harold Dale and an episode of Duckman. He continued with concerts and theater performances, including a critically acclaimed performances in Charles Rohm Smith's Tallulah and Tennessee, co-starring Betty Garrett as Estelle Winwood, Mae West at the Club El Fey and Me and Jezebel.  Other theatrical work includes Jeffrey and Fragile Fire, directed by Paul Winfield.

Bailey continued performing his characterizations, including benefits for AIDS research charities around the world. In July 2008, Bailey was slated to appear in Hollywood, London, New York and San Francisco, marking 40 years since he first performed as Garland in 1968.

In June 2009 Bailey played London's West End for the 40th anniversary of Judy's death. Susie Boyt from The Times wrote "There is nothing camp or stagey about his act—it can scarcely even be described as an act, for Bailey inhabits Garland's persona to such an extent that well, there she is. It is a supreme illusion, a sort of perfect madness."

Death

Bailey died on Saturday, May 30, 2015, of cardiac arrest due to complications of pneumonia, at Pacifica Hospital of the Valley in Sun Valley, California, according to his manager of 27 years, Stephen Campbell.  He was survived by his brother.

Discography
1972 Jim Bailey
1973 Jim Bailey Live at Carnegie Hall
1986 Mostly Mercer
1997 Club Verbotten
1998 Voices
2002 Judy Jim Judy

Singles
1972 "Every Minute Every Day"
1972 "When I Found You"
1973 "Love Song"
1988 "All I Ask Of You"

References

External links

Jim Bailey - YouTube
Jim Bailey dies at 77; impersonator gave voice to Garland, Streisand

1938 births
2015 deaths
American male film actors
American male television actors
American male singers
American drag queens
American LGBT musicians
People from Palmyra, New Jersey
People from Riverside Township, New Jersey